Elina Maria Katarina Barruk (born 1994) is a Swedish Sámi singer, songwriter and pianist, who sings in the Ume Sámi language, now spoken by less than a dozen native speakers. She believes her songs will help to revitalize the language. In September 2015, she released her first album, Báruos, and continues to perform in concerts inspired by traditional yoik music from the province of Västerbotten.

Biography
Born on 5 December 1994 in Storuman, Elina Maria Katarina Barruk has a mother who plays the piano and a father, Henrik Barruk, who yoiks and works on Sámi language preservation. Since early childhood, she aspired to become a musician herself. When she was 16, she moved to Umeå where she joined the music arts programme at Midgårdsskolan. There she formed a band with Elias Häreskog (bass), Mattias Nygren (percussion) and Emmy Westing (piano).

As Ume Sámi was spoken at home, she has also come to recognize the importance of helping the language to be used more widely.   She wrote the songs for Báruos, her first album, in the Ume language. Working with the Norwegian yoiker Frode Fjellheim, she has developed tracks varying from yoik to indie pop and jazz. In addition to her involvement in music, Barruk works as a Sámi teacher in Umeå and Storuman. She also teaches at the Algguogåhtie Association which since 2009 has received substantial grants to support Ume Sámi.

In both 2016 and 2018, Barruk starred at Norway's Varanger Festival in Vadsø where she has many fans. Singing in Ume Sámi, she explained that only two members of her generation spoke the language, she and her brother. In January 2019, she sang in Ume Sámi at UNESCO's launch of the International Year of Indigenous Languages.

Awards
Katarina Barruk was honoured with the Young Artist of the Year award at the 2012 Riddu Riđđu Sámi festival. The following year, she won the Youth Prize at Umeå's Sámi Week.

References

1994 births
Living people
People from Storuman Municipality
Swedish Sámi musicians
21st-century Swedish singers
21st-century Swedish women singers